Leonardus Gerardus (Rad) Kortenhorst  (12 November 1886, Weesp – 13 January 1963, The Hague) was a Dutch politician. He was president of the House of Representatives of the Netherlands from 12 August 1948 to 13 January 1963.

1886 births
1963 deaths
Catholic People's Party politicians
20th-century Dutch politicians
20th-century Dutch lawyers
Dutch Roman Catholics
Dutch political commentators
Members of the House of Representatives (Netherlands)
People from Weesp
Speakers of the House of Representatives (Netherlands)
Roman Catholic State Party politicians